The Tyndall Centre for Climate Change Research is an organisation based in the United Kingdom that brings together scientists, economists, engineers and social scientists to "research, assess and communicate from a distinct trans-disciplinary perspective, the options to mitigate, and the necessities to adapt to current climate change and continuing global warming, and to integrate these into the global, UK and local contexts of sustainable development".

The centre, named after the 19th-century Irish physicist John Tyndall and founded in 2000, has core partners of the University of East Anglia, Cardiff University, University of Manchester, Newcastle University. Fudan University joined the Tyndall Centre partnership in 2011.

The Tyndall Centre is headquartered, with the Climatic Research Unit, in the Hubert Lamb building at the University of East Anglia.  Its director is Professor Robert Nicholls at the University of East Anglia and former of Southampton University. Former directors of the Tyndall Centre include Professor Corinne Le Quéré FRS CBE and Professor Sir Robert Watson interim directors Carly Mclachlan and Professor Kevin Anderson, Professor Andrew Watkinson and Professor John Schellnhuber. The founding director is Professor Mike Hulme. Asher Minns is executive director.

See also
4 Degrees and Beyond International Climate Conference
Climate change in the United Kingdom
Kevin Anderson (scientist)
Climatic Research Unit
Adaptation to global warming
Mitigation of global warming

References

External links
Tyndall Centre official site
Radical Emissions Reduction Conference

Climate change organisations based in the United Kingdom
2000 establishments in the United Kingdom
Natural Environment Research Council
Research institutes in Norfolk
University of East Anglia